This article is a list of diseases of cassava (Manihot esculenta).

Bacterial and Phytoplasma diseases

Fungal diseases

Oomycete diseases

Miscellaneous diseases and disorders

Viral diseases 
Viruses are a severe problem in the tropics. Viruses are the primary reason for the complete lack of yield increases in the 25 years .

References 

 Common Names of Diseases, The American Phytopathological Society (APS)

Cassava